Pinecrest is the name of a number of places in North America:

Places

Canada 
 Pinecrest Road (Ottawa), in Ottawa
 Pinecrest Public School, in Ottawa
 Pinecrest Station (OC Transpo), in Ottawa

United States

Florida 
 Pinecrest, Florida, Miami-Dade County, population circa 19,000
 Pinecrest Gardens, a  park in Pinecrest, Florida on the corner of Southwest 111th Street (Killian Drive) and Southwest 57th Avenue (Red Road)
 Pinecrest, Hillsborough County, Florida, an unincorporated community east of Tampa
 Pinecrest, Monroe County, Florida, a ghost town, once home to Al Capone
 Old Pinecrest Hotel, Avon Park, Florida, listed on the NRHP in Florida

California 
 Pinecrest, Nevada County, California, an unincorporated community
 Pinecrest, Tuolumne County, California, an unincorporated community
 Pinecrest Diner, San Francisco, California

West Virginia 
 Pinecrest (Elkins, West Virginia), listed on the NRHP in West Virginia

Other 
 Pine Crest School, a private school with campuses in Fort Lauderdale, Florida and Boca Raton, Florida
 Pinecrest, a shopping center in Orange, Ohio
 Pinecrest Academy (Georgia), a private, Roman Catholic high school
 Pinecrest Bible Training Center, Salisbury Center, New York
 Pinecrest Elementary School, where most of the Peanuts go to school
 Pinecrest High School, Southern Pines, North Carolina